Shots Fired is an American ten-part drama television miniseries that aired on Fox from March 22, to May 24, 2017. The miniseries depicts a DOJ investigation into a racially-charged police shooting of an unarmed teenager, which leads to the DOJ officials uncovering a potential conspiracy involving the death of another teenager.

Premise
Experienced and temperamental investigator Ashe Akino and ambitious, young prosecutor Preston Terry are sent to Gate Station, North Carolina by the DOJ when Jesse Carr, an unarmed Caucasian teenager, is shot during a traffic stop by Joshua Beck, an African-American sheriff's deputy. As they study the shooting, Ashe and Preston learn about the unsolved death of African-American teenager Joey Campbell and begin to unravel a conspiracy.

Cast

Main cast
 Sanaa Lathan as Ashe Akino, a DOJ Investigator and veteran law enforcement officer partnered with Preston to work the case on Jesse's death.
 Stephan James as Preston Terry, a DOJ Special Prosecutor assigned to investigate Jesse's death with Ashe.
 Stephen Moyer as Calvert Breeland, a lieutenant in the Gate Station Sheriff's Office.
 Will Patton as Daniel Platt, the sheriff of Gate Station County.
 Tristan Wilds as Joshua Beck, the Gate Station Sheriff's deputy under investigation for shooting Jesse and the department's only African-American officer.
 Aisha Hinds as Janae James, a pastor of a church in Gate Station.
 DeWanda Wise as Shameeka Campbell, the mother of Joey and Shawn.
 Clare-Hope Ashitey as Kerry Beck, Joshua's wife.
 Conor Leslie as Sarah Ellis, the governor's aide to Eamons.
 Richard Dreyfuss as Arlen Cox, a real estate developer and campaign donor of Eamons.

Recurring
 Helen Hunt as Patricia Eamons, the Governor of North Carolina.
 Jill Hennessy as Alicia Carr, Jesse's mother.
 Beau Knapp as Caleb Brooks, a Gate Station Sheriff's deputy and friend of Joshua.
 Kylen Davis as Shawn Campbell, the younger son of Shameeka Campbell.
 Edwina Findley as Shirlane, a local reporter.
 Marqus Clae as Cory, a witness to Joey's shooting.
 John Beasley as Mr. Dabney, the owner of a local restaurant.
 Mike Pniewski as Julian Carroll, Ashe's and Preston's DOJ superior.
 Laila Lockhart Kraner as Kai Cano, Ashe's daughter.
 Angel Bonanni as Javier Cano, Ashe's former DEA partner and estranged husband.
 Jacob Leinbach as Jesse Carr, a North Carolina State University student shot by Joshua.
 Brett Cooper as Tess Breeland, Breeland's daughter.
 Yohance Myles as Leon Grant, Cory's father.
 Markice Moore as Lyndon, a mechanic on parole.
 David Shae as the handler, a mysterious individual attempting to cover-up Joey's shooting.

Guest
 Shamier Anderson as Maceo Terry, a running back for the Carolina Panthers and Preston's brother.
 Antonique Smith as Kiana, a witness to Joey's shooting.
 Lorraine Toussaint as Carole Moore, Kerry's mother.
 Kelvin Harrison Jr. as Joey Campbell, the deceased older son of Shameeka Campbell.
 Wes McGee as Derkin, a police sergeant formerly with the Gate Station Sheriff's Office.
 Britt Rentschler as Pierce, a DOJ attorney assigned to replace Preston.
 Javon Johnson as Davies, a DOJ investigator assigned to replace Ashe.
 J. Alphonse Nicholson as Junior, Joshua's cousin.
 Don A. King as Dr. Koppel, a campaign donor of Eamons.
 Vincent J. Hooper as Ivory Boyd, the residential assistant in Joey's residential hall.
 Dennis Haysbert as Mr. Terry, Preston's father.

Production

Development
On December 10, 2015, Fox announced that Shots Fired was picked up to series status. Gina Prince-Bythewood and Reggie Rock Bythewood created the series as a drama that aimed to reflect the racial tensions and police shooting incidents that have spurred demonstrations and outrage across the United States. Gina and Reggie will serve as executive producers along with Francie Calfo and Brian Grazer.

Filming
In March 2016, crews were filming in Kannapolis, North Carolina. They were expected to continue work in the area through July. Filming took place in Gastonia and Salisbury in April 2016. The Rowan County courthouse became the Gate County Courthouse, and a real WJZY news van appeared in a scene. Other scenes were filmed in Concord, Mooresville and Charlotte. In May, James B. Duke Memorial Library at Johnson C. Smith University played the role of the library at North Carolina State University.

Casting
It was announced in December 2015 that Sanaa Lathan was cast as Ashe Akino. In February 2016, DeWanda Wise was cast as Shameeka Campbell and Conor Leslie was cast as Sarah Ellis. In March 2016, Stephan James was cast as Preston Terry; Tristan Wilds and Aisha Hinds were cast as Officer Belk (Beck) and Pastor Janae James, respectively; Helen Hunt, Richard Dreyfuss, and Stephen Moyer were cast as Patricia Eamons, Arlen Cox, and Officer Breeland, respectively; Will Patton was cast as Sheriff Daniel Platt; Jill Hennessy was cast as Alicia Carr; and Clare-Hope Ashitey was cast as Kerry Beck.

Episodes

Reception 
On Rotten Tomatoes, Shots Fired holds a "Certified Fresh" approval rating of 84% based on 43 reviews. The site's critical consensus states, "Shots Fired tackles tough topics commendably -- and remains consistently compelling despite an occasionally meandering plot. Metacritic gives the miniseries a score of 66 out of 100 based on 27 critics, indicating "generally favorable reviews".

James Poniewozik of The New York Times called the show "curious at first glance" but "complex." He praised the acting, especially that of Sanaa Lathan, the program's multilayered storylines, and compared it to the ABC's American Crime and HBO's The Wire. However, Poniewozik also criticized the show's handling of the political sideplots, and said "a lot of the exposition is ham-handed."

Writing for The Hollywood Reporter, Daniel Fienberg also praised Lathan's acting, but said the show offered "clunky mystery plotting". He went on to say "sometimes Shots Fired articulates its points smartly and with pragmatism, but other times you're stuck with characters saying things like "Liberals can be racist, too," as if that weren't already being illustrated everywhere. Perhaps there isn't as much hand-holding as in ABC's American Crime, but it's also significantly less ideologically ambitious than John Ridley's drama, which should come with footnotes." He also mocked the show's methods of stretching the plot across 10 episodes, However, he did conclude that "there is much to admire here."

USA Today mentioned the stellar directing crew and said the show features "interesting characters (especially women)". However, they said the story could've been "told more sensibly and efficiently". They praised the plot but overall had mixed impressions of the show overall.

Chris Cabin of Collider gave Shots Fired two stars and called the show "timely", adding that it's "ultimately more melodrama than crime story or political polemic", but also argued that the show spends more time on the investigators' lives than the actual case. Ultimately, Cabin found the miniseries ambitious, but failed to capitalize.

IGN reviewer Jesse Schedeen gave the pilot a 6.7, or "Okay", rating and called the show's handling of the shooting "both callous and pointless." Schedeen wrote that the miniseries strays from the social conflict at hand to the mysteries of the deaths of the two young teens, and additionally the dialogue "becomes downright hamfisted," but praised the "strong cast".

Newsday gave the show a "B" rating, calling it "ambitious" and "at times a bit exhausting," but nevertheless had mostly praise for the miniseries.

Emily VanDerWerff of Vox gave Shots Fired a 3 out of 5 rating, calling it "generally excellent", and said "Shots [Fired] aims to be American Crime or The Wire. It doesn't get there. The new limited series is a handsomely directed, nicely acted, overly complex mess." Praised were the characters and the premise, while also noting that "the show waters down interesting ideas at every turn...by the time I reached Shots Fired'''s 500th scene with too-loud music meant to tell me how to feel about what was happening, I wanted to be watching anything else."

The LA Times said the miniseries has ambitions to be "something big...like ABC's American Crime or FX's American Crime Story...in practice, it plays more like True Detective, Junior Grade." The romantic plot lines were criticized, saying "major and minor characters rapidly fall into bed, more to get some sex into the story than anything to do with the characters or the case at hand." Praise was directed towards its premise and acting, but its dialogue was negatively received, concluding that "Shots Fired lumbers as an issue drama".

Ben Travers of IndieWire gave the show a positive review, calling Shots Fired "messy but ambitious," with comparisons to American Crime and American Crime Story, "engaging", and "(mostly) well-executed", adding that the miniseries "stands out for the right reasons." Travers praised Lathan's performance as Ashe Akino, but added that her subplots push the show "into extreme melodrama, and make for a jarring change of pace." While criticizing the potential romantic subplots for Preston Terry and Ashe and stating "a few characters are reduced to representatives", Travers praised the miniseries' plot and its ability to "skirt...[tricky] questions." He gave the show a "B−" grade.

Hungry Watching gave the show a "C+" grade and called the show "timely and compelling", but also said it has a "lack of excitement that leaves me with no real compulsion to keep watching."

Vulture praised the show's ambition and "solid" cast, saying "Lathan [gets] the sort of lead role her charisma has long demanded." Further praise was made towards her character's unpredictability and the miniseries' musical choices for the soundtrack, while also finding Shots Fired to become "less daring and more predictable when it goes into procedural mode."

Deadline reviewer Dominic Patten said the miniseries "stays too close for comfort" and "doesn't ultimately take off much beyond the bounds of Big 4 procedurals." Patten also called the show "good and smart", but lamented that it didn't take more risks.

Danette Chazes of the AV/TV Club called Shots Fired'' "some of the most ambitious event television ever" that "cram[s a lot] into a limited series" and praised the "compelling story".

References

External links

2010s American drama television series
2017 American television series debuts
2017 American television series endings
English-language television shows
Fox Broadcasting Company original programming
Serial drama television series
Television series by 20th Century Fox Television
Television shows filmed in North Carolina
Television shows set in North Carolina
Television series by Imagine Entertainment